Brandon Lauton (born 3 March 2000), is a South African-Australian professional soccer player who plays as a midfielder for Hume City. On 7 August 2019, he made his professional debut against Newcastle Jets in the 2019 FFA Cup. He moved to Australia at the age of 2.

Lauton has two younger brothers, Jordan and Leighton, who are also footballers; the latter currently plays for the Western United NPL3 squad.

During the off-season following the 2020–21 A-League season, Lauton was released by Melbourne Victory and during the pre-season trialled with Western United and Hume City.

References

External links

2000 births
Living people
Australian soccer players
Association football midfielders
Melbourne Victory FC players
National Premier Leagues players